Hassan Walid Ahmed Kaddah (born 1 May 2000) is an Egyptian handball player for Khaleej and the Egyptian national team.

He first started handball at Al-Shams Club. He participated at the 2019 Youth World Championship, where he became top scorer and chosen for the All-Star Team as best left back. He also participated at the 2019 Junior World Championship.

He represented Egypt at the 2021 World Championship and the 2020 Summer Olympics in Tokyo.

From the summer of 2023 he will be joining Industria Kielce.

Current position: Left back (LB)

Honours

National titles

Zamalek
 Egyptian Handball League: 2
 Champions:  2019–20, 2020–21.

International titles

Zamalek
 African Handball Champions League: 1 
 Champions: 2019
 African Handball Super Cup: 1
 Champions: 2021

Individual awards
 Top scorer at the 2019 Youth World Championship (51 goals)
 All-Star Team as Best left back at the 2019 Youth World Championship
 Top scorer at the 2022 IHF Super Globe (45 goals)

References 

Living people
2000 births
Egyptian male handball players
Olympic handball players of Egypt
Handball players at the 2020 Summer Olympics
Competitors at the 2022 Mediterranean Games
Mediterranean Games silver medalists for Egypt
Mediterranean Games medalists in handball
21st-century Egyptian people